A domino mask is a small, often rounded mask covering only the area around the eyes and the space between them. The masks have seen special prevalence since the 18th century, when they became traditional wear in particular local manifestations of Carnival, particularly with Venetian Carnival, as part of a domino costume, which included the mask and a black cloak. Domino masks have found their way into a variety of high and popular art forms.

Name
The name is believed to derive from the Latin dominus, for "lord".  The exact derivation is unknown.

History

Domino masks are worn during Carnival, e.g. at the Venetian Carnival, where it was the part of the more extensive black (though occasionally white and blue) domino costume worn by both male and female participants, which accomplished the requirement of the masquerade that participants be masked or otherwise disguised, and achieved the elements of adventure, conspiracy, intrigue, and mystery that were distinctives of the masquerade atmosphere; the costume included the mask, as well as a cloak to envelope the body, and sometimes a hood (bahoo).

The domino mask has also found its way into the political landscapes of non-Western cultures via political cartooning, though likely through the earlier influences of popular (and therefore exported) 18th century and later European and American purveyors of the same genre: for instance, Johnny Hidajat, the Indonesian New Order cartoonist (e.g., for Pos Kota and Stop in Jakarta) consistently features the character Djon Domino, and a relationship between this character and the domino mask has been argued.

In art

Domino masks have appeared in various images in art, such as La Femme au Masque, a painting by Henri Gervex in 1885. The subject is 22-year old Parisienne Marie Renard wearing only a domino mask.

The mask is popular in superhero comics, where it is often worn by costumed heroes and villains with the implication that they hide the hero's secret identity, or by earlier hero tropes such as Zorro, The Lone Ranger, Robin the Boy Wonder and the Green Hornet.

See also
 Harlequin

References

External links

 "La bottega dei Mascareri" (The workshop of Mascareri/the Mask-makers), see , accessed 13 October 2014.
 "Student Project:General Commonalities in the Masquerade," see , accessed 13 October 2014.
 "History of Venetian Masks," at Masks of Venice retail site, see , accessed 13 October 2014.

Masks in Europe
Costume design
Masquerade ceremonies
Ritual masks